William R. H. Martin (1842, St. Louis, Missouri - January 30, 1912, Manhattan, New York) was a US business man and one of the largest holders of real estate in Manhattan. He became head of Rogers Peet in 1877, and he was the owner and developer of the Hotel Martinique (now the Radisson Hotel Martinique).

References

1842 births
1912 deaths
Businesspeople from St. Louis
Businesspeople from New York City
People from Manhattan
American retail chief executives
Hotel founders
19th-century American businesspeople